The Zimbabwean cricket team toured Australia in the 2003–04 season. On the tour, the Zimbabweans played two unclassified matches, one First-class match, three List A matches and two Tests, as well as taking part in the 2003–04 VB Series with Australia and India – who were touring Australia for four Tests at the same time. The Zimbabweans lost all but one international match – both Tests and seven of the eight One Day Internationals – the exception being called off for rain.

The tour was notable for Matthew Hayden's score of 380 in the first Test, this being the highest individual score in Test cricket at the time, beating Brian Lara's 375.

Tour matches

Three-day: Zimbabweans v Rockingham-Mandurah Invitational XI

50-over: Zimbabweans v Cricket Australia Chairman's XI

First-class: Zimbabweans v Western Australia

List A: Zimbabweans v Australia A

List A: Zimbabweans v Western Australia

List A: Zimbabweans v Australia A

Test series

1st Test

Matthew Hayden recorded the highest score ever in Test cricket, at the time, with his 380 in the first innings, surpassing the 375 set by Brian Lara in Antigua a decade earlier. Lara went on to reclaim the record less than six months later, however, with his 400 not out against England.

2nd Test

Records
Australia's Matthew Hayden was named Man of the Series for his 501 runs over the two Tests and the historic triple-century. Comparatively, Mark Vermeulen scored the most runs for Zimbabwe with 166. Andy Bichel took the most wickets of the series with 10, with Ray Price taking six for Zimbabwe.

See also
Indian cricket team in Australia in 2003–04
2003–04 VB Series

Notes

External links
 CricketArchive – Tour homepage
 CricketArchive – VB Series homepage
 Cricinfo – Tour homepage
 Cricinfo – VB Series homepage
 Cricinfo – Tour averages
 Cricinfo – VB Series averages

References
 Playfair Cricket Annual
 Wisden Cricketers Almanack

2003 in Zimbabwean cricket
2004 in Zimbabwean cricket
2003 in Australian cricket
2004 in Australian cricket
2003–04 Australian cricket season
2003–04
International cricket competitions in 2003–04